Västra Karup is a locality situated in Båstad Municipality, Skåne County, Sweden with 582 inhabitants in 2010. Birgit Nilsson was born there 1918.

Sports
The following sports clubs are located in Västra Karup:

 Västra Karups IF

References 

Populated places in Båstad Municipality
Populated places in Skåne County